Wait Until The Evening is a novel by Hal Bennett published in 1974. It was the follow-up to his award-winning novel Lord of Dark Places.

References

African-American novels
1974 American novels
Novels set in New Jersey
Novels by Hal Bennett